"Save Me (This Is An SOS)" is an English song released on 29 May in Sweden by Lionheart Music Group. Save Me" is the third single from Helena Paparizou's seventh album Ti Ora Tha Vgoume?. However, "Save Me" is the lead single from the third English-language album titled One Life which was released on 26 March 2014. In the album, there is also the Greek version of the song titled "Sou Stelno SOS".

Release and Promo
The song premiered on Swedish national radio station P4 in mid-May and on 29th of the same month it premieres on Swedish iTunes. On 30 May the song premiered in all Greek radios by EMI. Paparizou performed "Save Me" in a mashup version along with Gala's "Freed From Desire" at the annual [Mad Video Music Awards]. As for the promotion of the single, Paparizou had "Save Me (This Is An SOS)" at the setlist of her summer concerts, along with four dancers.

Talking about the Swedish market, she performed the song at Lotta Pa Liseberg on June 17, as well as at the Stockholm Pride, Nickelodeondagen on August 1 and Bingolotto on October 27.

Charts

References

2013 singles
Helena Paparizou songs
2013 songs
Songs written by Jimmy Jansson
Songs written by Bobby Ljunggren
EMI Records singles